Mithila is a municipality in Danusha District in Madhesh Province of south-eastern Nepal. After the government announcement the municipality was established on 2 December 2014 by merging the existing Begadawar, Nakatajhijh and Dhalkebar village development committees (VDCs). At the time of the 2011 Nepal census after merging the three VDCs population it had a total population of 31,575 persons. After the government decision the number of municipalities has reached 191 in Nepal.

References

External links
UN map of the municipalities of Dhanusa District

Populated places in Dhanusha District
Nepal municipalities established in 2014
Municipalities in Madhesh Province